Thomas Ronald "Hawkeye" Webster (October 4, 1948 – April 10, 2020) was a Canadian professional ice hockey player and coach.

Playing career
Originally selected by the Boston Bruins in the 1966 NHL Entry Draft, Webster played in a total of 102 National Hockey League (NHL) games with the Bruins and Detroit Red Wings. Webster scored 30 goals for the Red Wings in the 1970-71 season, but only managed 3 goals in 12 games of the 1971-72 season. He also played 352 games for the New England Whalers of the World Hockey Association, scoring 40 or more goals three times. Spinal fusion surgery  complicated the end of his career, and Webster retired in 1981 at age 31.

Coaching career
After retiring as a player, Webster had been the coach for a number of teams at various levels of hockey.

His first head coaching job came in 1986, when he became coach of the New York Rangers following the firing of Ted Sator. After only five games, Webster fell ill with what was later diagnosed as an inner-ear infection that left him unable to fly. He returned as head coach on January 5 for home games only; general manager Phil Esposito split coaching duties with assistants Eddie Giacomin and Wayne Cashman for road games. He was cleared to fly again in January, but suffered a relapse during a game against the Edmonton Oilers, and was told to stay off planes for at least three months. Esposito named himself head coach for the remainder of the season. When it became apparent that Webster would not be able to return to the bench full-time the following season, he resigned on April 30, 1987.

Webster's next head coaching stint was with the Los Angeles Kings, from May 31, 1989, to May 4, 1992. He led the Kings to their first and only regular season division title in franchise history, in the 1990-91 season.

While coaching the Kings in a game against Detroit on November 16, 1991, Webster became upset at what he felt was a blown call by referee Kerry Fraser. The Kings were assessed an extra penalty, and Webster took a stick and threw it on the ice, hitting one of Fraser's skates. Webster was suspended for 12 games.

Webster also served as an amateur scout for the Calgary Flames from 2003 to 2014.

Honours
In 2012, he was inducted into the World Hockey Association Hall of Fame.

Death
Webster died on April 10, 2020 at the age of 71; he had been reported to have brain cancer.

Career statistics

Regular season and playoffs

International

Coaching record

References

External links

Profile at hockeydraftcentral.com

1948 births
2020 deaths
Adirondack Red Wings players
Boston Bruins draft picks
Boston Bruins players
Calgary Flames scouts
California Golden Seals players
Canadian ice hockey coaches
Canadian ice hockey right wingers
Carolina Hurricanes coaches
Detroit Junior Red Wings coaches
Detroit Red Wings players
Florida Panthers coaches
Hartford Whalers coaches
Ice hockey people from Ontario
Los Angeles Kings coaches
New England Whalers players
New York Rangers coaches
Niagara Falls Flyers players
Philadelphia Flyers coaches
Sportspeople from Kirkland Lake
Windsor Spitfires coaches
World Hockey Association broadcasters